Stefán Rafn Sigurmannsson (born 19 May 1990) is an Icelandic handball player for Haukar Handball and the Icelandic national team.

He represented Iceland at the 2019 World Men's Handball Championship.

Honours and awards

MOL-Pick Szeged
 K&H Férfi Kézilabda Liga: 2017–18
 Magyar Kézilabdakupa: 2018–19

References

1990 births
Icelandic male handball players
Living people
People from Hafnarfjörður
Handball-Bundesliga players
Expatriate handball players
Icelandic expatriate sportspeople in Denmark
Icelandic expatriate sportspeople in Germany
Icelandic expatriate sportspeople in Hungary
Rhein-Neckar Löwen players
Haukar men's handball players
SC Pick Szeged players
Aalborg Håndbold players